Roosevelt Terrence Ocampo Adams (born May 22, 1994) is a Filipino-American professional basketball player for Kagawa Five Arrows of the B2 League. Adams was selected 1st overall by the Columbian Dyip in the regular draft of the 2019 PBA draft. He played college basketball at College of Idaho.

Early life 
Adams played high school basketball at West Valley High, where he earned All-Mountain Pass League honors.

College career 
As a Coyote, he played in all 34 games as a junior, including 21 starts. He averaged 8.7 points and 7.1 rebounds per game. He posted a career-high 24 points against Northwest University.

Professional career 
Adams is eligible to play as an import player with Asian lineage in Japan, Korea, or the Philippines. He finished the 2020 PBA Philippine Cup with averages of 10.3 points on 38.7% shooting, along with 8.1 rebounds per game. After not signing an extension with the Dyip, Adams became a restricted free agent in the PBA. Following his first year in the PBA, he signed with Terrafirma.

On September 21, 2022, Adams signed with Kagawa Five Arrows of the B2 League.

Personal life  
He is the son of Gregory and Anita Adams.

PBA career statistics

As of the end of 2021 season

Season-by-season averages

|-
| align=left | 
| align="left"| Terrafirma
| 9 || 27.8 || .388 || .370 || .778 || 8.1 || .9 || .6 || .2 || 10.3
|-
| align=left | 
| align="left"| Terrafirma
| 13 || 22.4 || .404 || .393 || .692 || 6.3 || .4 || .6 || .4 || 9.2
|- class="sortbottom"
| style="text-align:center;" colspan="2"|Career
| 22 || 24.6 || .397 || .382 || .727 || 7.0 || .6 || .6 || .3 || 9.7

Notes

References

1994 births
Living people
African-American basketball players
American men's basketball players
American sportspeople of Filipino descent
Basketball players from Arizona
Citizens of the Philippines through descent
College of Idaho Coyotes men's basketball players
Filipino expatriate basketball people in Japan
Filipino men's basketball players
Kagawa Five Arrows players
Maharlika Pilipinas Basketball League players
People from Yuma, Arizona
Philippines men's national basketball team players
Small forwards
Terrafirma Dyip draft picks
Terrafirma Dyip players